The following is a list of politicians from Kerala, a state in India.

See also

 List of political leaders from Kerala
 List of politicians from Bihar

References

Kerala
 
Lists of people from Kerala
Politicians